Pärnu Alevi Cemetery is a cemetery in Pärnu, Estonia.

The cemetery was established in 1773.

Notable burials
 Amandus Heinrich Adamson, Estonian sculptor and painter
 Johann Heinrich Rosenplänter, Baltic German linguist and Estophile

References

Cemeteries in Estonia
Pärnu
1773 establishments in the Russian Empire